

The Safe Conducts Act 1414 (2 Hen. 5 c.6) was an Act of the Parliament of England. It made it high treason to break a truce or promise of safe conduct by killing, robbing or "spoiling" the victim. Unusually, the "voluntary receipt" or "concealing" of people who had violated this Act was also stated to be treason.

The Act was suspended for 7 years in 1435, and permanently repealed in 1442.

See also
 Misprision of treason

References

Related Acts of 15th Century England

External links
 

Treason in England
Acts of the Parliament of England
1410s in law
1414 in England